The 1961 Wightman Cup was the 33rd edition of the annual women's team tennis competition between the United States and Great Britain. It was held at the Saddle & Cycle Club in Chicago, Illinois in the United States.

References

1961
1961 in tennis
1961 in American tennis
1961 in British sport
1961 in Illinois
1961 in women's tennis